Funhit Mein Jaari or simply known as FMJ, is an Indian Hindi language television comedy series. The show was produced by Haarsh Limbachiyaa under the banner H3 Entertainment. It premiered from 22 August 2020 to 30 January 2021 on SAB TV.

Summary
The episodes last three minutes each. Every weekend, five episodes of five different segments are released. Each segment presents a new topic.

Cast
 Krushna Abhishek as Kashmera/Majnu/Golu's principal/Daya/Chattapa
 Bharti Singh as Madam/Golu/Sanjana/Rajmata/ACP Pradhyuman 
 Jasmin Bhasin as Mother of Golu                      
Mubeen Saudagar as Peon/Shetty Don/Babubali/Dr. Phalunke
Jyoti sharma as Babesena

See also
 List of programs broadcast by Sony SAB
 List of Hindi comedy shows

References

External links
Official Website

Sony SAB original programming
2020 Indian television series debuts
Indian comedy television series